Hidden Stash V: Bong Loads & B-Sides is the fourth b-sides and rarities collection by the Kottonmouth Kings.  It contains b-sides and remixes from the albums Long Live The Kings (2010) and Sunrise Sessions (2011).  Unlike Hidden Stash III and Hidden Stash 420, Hidden Stash V does not contain songs by other artists that feature Kottonmouth Kings members.  Certain versions of the album include a bonus DVD that includes pranks, music videos, and revisions.

Track listing

*These songs were released as a Nugg of the Week (limited time free download on the Kottonmouth Kings official website) prior to appearing on the indicated retail release.

DVD
 Stonetown Intro
 Pot shot #1
 Love Lost
 Pot shot#2
 Cruisin’
 Pot shot #3
 Boom Clap Sound
 Pot shot #4
 My Garden
 Pot shot #5
 Reefer Madness
 Pot Shot #6
 Mushrooms
 D Iz Who I B 
 At it Again
 Amerika's Most Busted Part 1
 Great when you’re high
 KMK Live Bust
 No Cops
 Amerika's Most Busted Part 2
 Stomp /Rampage
 Defy Gravity
 Party Girls
 Pack Your Bowls
 Suffocation
 Say goodbye (Tangerine Sky)
 Bonus Blue Skies - 30 minutes
 Bonus: Underground Revolution trailer

References

http://store.kottonmouthkings.com/bongloads-and-b-sides-pre-sale/kottonmouth-kings-bong-loads-and-b-sides-presale-bundle.html
https://itunes.apple.com/us/album/hidden-stash-vol.-5-bong-loads/id474171701

2011 albums
Kottonmouth Kings albums
Sequel albums